Babe Bhangra Paunde Ne is an Indian Punjabi comedy film directed by Amarjit Singh Saron. It stars Diljit Dosanjh, Sargun Mehta and Sohail Ahmed with Gurpreet Bhangu, Jassica Gill and Bhavkhandan Singh Rakhra in supporting roles. The film depicting story of three friends, who try to adopt an orphaned old man into usurping his insurance money to get rich with shortcut.

It was released on 5 October 2022 in India and Canada.

Plot 
Jaggi and his friends are on a mission, looking to be rich and successful easily. They have many ideas, like innovative underwear and machines to produce butter and ghee instantly. They try to use Jaggi's girlfriend, Mithi's father for investments, but they fail to do so and Mithi breaks up with Jaggi. Suddenly, they got an idea to acquiring a father and getting his insurance with insurance company, so they can legally claim tons of dollars after death of said old man.They disguise themselves as businessmen, go to an old age home and quickly become close to the seniors living there, all the while looking for the one person that will die the fastest. They select mr Iqbal, whose kidneys are not working and his liver is infected.They get him insured, and wait for time to pass by while the papers get ready. Unfortunately, the old man refuses to die and even runs a marathon, which he wins. In a desperate attempt, Jaggi adopts another old person, but the plan backfires and he is now stuck with the entire nursing home seniors at his rented house, along with the caretaker of them all, Preet, whom Jaggi is attracted to. When his money eventually runs out, Jaggi goes to an Asian gangster for money, who tells him to steal the Queen's crown at an event in the city. Jaggi agrees, and takes the help of the seniors, whilst keeping everything a secret from preet. The plan is sucessfull, but preet comes to know the truth, along with another revelation jaggi's frustrated friend, bhullar, reveals: the oldies were adopted for insurance money. The group leaves, and Jaggi oon comes to know that Mr. Iqbal's kidneys have failed. He rushes to the hospital, begs for forgiveness, and offers up his own kidney. The film ends with the group reunited and Mr. Iqbal fit as ever

Cast 

 Diljit Dosanjh as Jaggi
 Sohail Ahmed as Iqbal
 Sargun Mehta as Preet
 Sangtar Singh as Bhullar
 Kaul Lakhan
 Gurpreet Bhangu
 Jassica Gill
 Balinder Johal
 Devinder Dillon
 Bhavkhandan Singh Rakhra

Production and release 
The film is Diljit Dosanjh's home production where he launched his banner Thind Motion Films along with Storytime Productions.

References

External links 

 

2022 films
Indian slapstick comedy films
Punjabi-language Indian films
2020s Punjabi-language films
Cultural depictions of Elizabeth II